Virumandikum Sivanandikum is a 2016 Indian Tamil-language comedy drama film directed by Vincent Selva and starring debutante Sanjay and Arundhati Nair with Thambi Ramaiah in an important role. The film was dubbed in Hindi as Royal Treat.

Plot 
Shiva, who is not interested a government job, does business with his friend. They borrow money from an evil moneylender and pay back the money with interest. Shiva and his friend end up in money issues, A director, Ganduchamy, who is a fraud, makes a movie with Shiva as the protagonist, his friend as the antagonist, and a woman, Nandhini, as the female protagonist. He promises to give Shiva six lakhs for acting in the film. Vincent Selva works as the cameraman for the film. The director shoots the film without Nandhini knowing that she is a part of the film. After shooting for the film, Shiva falls in love with Nandhini. Sivanandi, the head of a village, finds out that Shiva was part of a film with Nandhini, a girl who ran away from her village, after Vincent Selva posts the film on YouTube. Nandhini's father, Virumandi is the head of Sivanandi's rival village. How the rival villages solve their problems and whether or not Shiva will reunite with Nandhini form the rest of the story.

Cast 

Sanjay as Shiva
Arundhati Nair as Nandhini
Thambi Ramaiah as Ganduchamy
Aadukalam Murugadoss as Shiva's friend
Ashwin as Vincent Selva
Joe Malloori as Virumandi
Bala Singh as Sivanandi
Paavendhan
Arivazhagan
Robo Shankar as V. Vela Ramamoorthy
Manobala
Delhi Ganesh
Mayilsamy 
Yogi Babu as Moneylender's assistant 
George as Shiva's father
Senthi Kumari as Shiva's mother
T. P. Gajendran as Hotel owner
Sona
Nambirajan
Supergood Subramani
Pei Krishnan as Vathalam

Soundtrack
Soundtrack was composed by R. Devarajan.
"Palapalakkudhu" - Velmurugan
"Kottudhu Kottudhu" - Prasanna, Chinmayi
"Ullankai Adikkudhu" - Haricharan, Priyanka 
"Parayadikkudhu Machan" - Priyanka

Release 
The Times of India Samayam gave the film a rating of three out of five stars. The reviewer praised the title and Thambi Ramaiah's performance while criticizing certain dialogues and illogical scenes. A critic from Vikatan criticized the tile stating that it has little reference to the film and the lack of entertaining comedy scenes. Maalai Malar praised the performances of the lead cast and Thambu Ramaiah while criticizing the amount of comedy sequences that have no relevance to the film. Kungumam praised the performances of the lead cast, Thambi Ramaiah, and the comedy artists while stating the cinematography is mediocre.

References 

2016 films
2016 comedy-drama films
2010s Tamil-language films
Indian comedy-drama films